Catherine Moore Barry (October 1752 – September 1823) was a heroine of the American Revolutionary War. She was the daughter of Charles and Mary Moore, and the eldest of ten children. She married Andrew Barry in 1767 at the age of 15 and lived on Walnut Grove Plantation in Roebuck, South Carolina during the 18th century. She was instrumental in helping to warn the militia of the coming British before the Battle of Cowpens in 1781. According to legend, she tied her toddler to the bedpost   while she rode out to warn neighbors that the British were coming.

Her warning helped to prepare the colonial forces to defeat the British governor, Cornwallis and his men and drive them north, out of the state of South Carolina. She is buried in the family cemetery in Moore, South Carolina, beside her husband, Andrew, who was one of the first elders of the Nazareth Presbyterian Church. She knew the Indian trails and shortcuts where almost no patriots lived. Barry was a spy and message bearer for the militia when the Battle of Cowpens was fought on January 17, 1781.

The Battle of Cowpens (January 17, 1781) was a decisive victory by Continental army forces under Brigadier General Daniel Morgan, in the Southern campaign of the American Revolutionary War. It was a turning point in the reconquest of South Carolina from the British.

Kate Barry was an ancestor of the actress Amanda Blake (1929-1989), remembered for the role of the red-haired saloon proprietress "Miss Kitty Russell" on the television western Gunsmoke.  Blake placed a cameo-sized portrait of Barry owned by her family in the Spartanburg, South Carolina local history museum, where it remains on display to this day.

References

External links
Margaret Barry at Find a Grave; note the portrait in the middle is that of Margaret Barry; the portrait on top is that of Abigail Adams, wife of President John Adams

Further reading 
 Babits, Lawrence Edward. 2001. A devil of a whipping: the Battle of Cowpens. Chapel Hill: University of North Carolina Press.

 Edgar, Walter. 2006. The South Carolina encyclopedia. Columbia, S.C: University of South Carolina Press.
 Grundset, Eric, Briana L. Diaz, and Hollis L. Gentry. 2011. America's Women in the Revolutionary Era: A History through Bibliography. Washington, D.C.: National Society Daughters of the American Revolution.

1752 births
1823 deaths
Women in the American Revolution
South Carolina colonial people
South Carolina militiamen in the American Revolution